Lacombe-Stettler was a provincial electoral district in Alberta, Canada, mandated to return a single member to the Legislative Assembly of Alberta using the first-past-the-post method of voting from 1993 to 2004.

History
The Lacombe-Stettler electoral district was formed in 1993 combining portions of the Lacombe and Stettler electoral districts. The district is named after the City of Lacombe and the Town of Stettler.

The Lacombe-Stettler electoral district was abolished following the 2003 electoral boundary re-distribution. The district was split with portions of the district were combined with portions of Ponoka-Rimbey to form Lacombe-Ponoka, and other portions combined with Drumheller-Chinook to form Drumheller-Stettler.

Members of the Legislative Assembly (MLAs)

Election results

1993 general election

1997 general election

2001 general election

See also
List of Alberta provincial electoral districts
Lacombe, Alberta, a city in Alberta
Stettler, Alberta, a town in Alberta

References

Further reading

External links
Elections Alberta
The Legislative Assembly of Alberta

Former provincial electoral districts of Alberta